This is a list of 268 species in Oxybelus, a genus of square-headed wasps in the family Crabronidae.

Oxybelus species

 Oxybelus abdominalis C. Baker, 1896 i c g
 Oxybelus acutissimus Bischoff, 1912 i c g
 Oxybelus adductus Kazenas, 1994 i c g
 Oxybelus admissus Kazenas, 1990 i c g
 Oxybelus aestuosus Bingham, 1897 i c g
 Oxybelus aethiopicus Cameron, 1906 i c g
 Oxybelus aganis R. Bohart, 1993 i c g
 Oxybelus agilis F. Smith, 1856 i c g
 Oxybelus albipes F. Morawitz, 1894 i c g
 Oxybelus albofasciatus Kazenas, 2001 i c g
 Oxybelus albopictus Radoszkowski, 1877 i c g
 Oxybelus alexanderi Kazenas, 2004 i c g
 Oxybelus alhumdalilleri Guichard, 1990 i c g
 Oxybelus americanus Spinola, 1842 i c g
 Oxybelus amoenus Kazenas, 1994 i c g
 Oxybelus analis Cresson, 1865 i c g
 Oxybelus andinus Brèthes, 1913 i c g
 Oxybelus angustus de Saussure, 1892 i c g
 Oxybelus antropovi Kazenas, 2004 i c g
 Oxybelus arabicus Guichard, 1990 i c g
 Oxybelus argentatus Curtis, 1833 i c g
 Oxybelus argenteopilosus Cameron, 1891 i c g
 Oxybelus argentinus Brèthes, 1913 i c g
 Oxybelus argypheus R. Bohart and Schlinger, 1956 i c g
 Oxybelus arnoldi Benoit, 1951 i c g
 Oxybelus aurantiacus Mocsáry, 1883 i c g
 Oxybelus aurifrons F. Smith, 1856 i c g
 Oxybelus ayuttayanus Tsuneki, 1974 i c g
 Oxybelus aztecus Cameron, 1891 i c g
 Oxybelus bareii Radoszkowski, 1893 i c g
 Oxybelus bechuanae Arnold, 1936 i c g
 Oxybelus bicornutus Arnold, 1929 i c g
 Oxybelus bipunctatus Olivier, 1812 i c g b
 Oxybelus braunsi Arnold, 1927 i c g
 Oxybelus brethesi R. Bohart, 1993 i c g
 Oxybelus californicus R. Bohart and Schlinger, 1956 i c g
 Oxybelus callani Pate, 1943 i c g
 Oxybelus canaliculatus Radoszkowski, 1877 i c g
 Oxybelus canalis R. Bohart and Schlinger, 1956 i c g
 Oxybelus canescens Cameron, 1890 i c g
 Oxybelus carinatus Gussakovskij, 1933 i c g
 Oxybelus catamarcensis (Schrottky, 1909) i c g
 Oxybelus caucasicus Radoszkowski, 1893 i c g
 Oxybelus chilensis Reed, 1894 i c g
 Oxybelus cinemucro R. Bohart, 1993 i c g
 Oxybelus citrinulus Gussakovskij, 1952 i c g
 Oxybelus citrinus Radoszkowski, 1893 i c g
 Oxybelus clandestinus Kohl, 1905 i c g
 Oxybelus cocacolae P. Verhoeff, 1968 i c g
 Oxybelus cochise Pate, 1943 i c g
 Oxybelus cocopa Pate, 1943 i c g
 Oxybelus collaris Kohl, 1884 i c g
 Oxybelus coloratus R. Bohart, 1993 i c g
 Oxybelus concinnus Stephens, 1829 i c g
 Oxybelus confusus Alayo Dalmau, 1968 i c g
 Oxybelus congophilus Benoit, 1951 i c g
 Oxybelus coniferus Arnold, 1951 i c g
 Oxybelus continuus Dahlbom, 1845 i c g
 Oxybelus cordatus Spinola, 1851 i c g
 Oxybelus cordiformis Gussakovskij, 1952 i c g
 Oxybelus cornutus C. Robertson, 1889 i c g
 Oxybelus crandalli R. Bohart and Schlinger, 1956 i c g
 Oxybelus cressonii C. Robertson, 1889 i c g b
 Oxybelus cristatus de Saussure, 1892 i c g
 Oxybelus curviscutis Arnold, 1927 i c g
 Oxybelus cyaneus R. Bohart, 1993 i c g
 Oxybelus decoris R. Bohart, 1993 i c g
 Oxybelus decorosus (Mickel, 1916) i c g
 Oxybelus diphyllus (A. Costa, 1882) i c g
 Oxybelus dissectus Dahlbom, 1845 i c g
 Oxybelus dissimilis Arnold, 1934 i c g
 Oxybelus dusmeti Mingo Pérez, 1966 i c g
 Oxybelus eburneoguttatus Arnold, 1952 i c g
 Oxybelus eburneus Radoszkowski, 1877 i c g
 Oxybelus elongatus Radoszkowski, 1877 i c g
 Oxybelus emarginatus Say, 1837 i c g b
 Oxybelus exclamans Viereck, 1906 i c g
 Oxybelus eximius Spinola, 1894 i c g
 Oxybelus fedtschenkoi Radoszkowski, 1877 i c g
 Oxybelus fischeri Spinola, 1839 i c g
 Oxybelus fissus Lepeletier de Saint Fargeau, 1845 c g
 Oxybelus flagellifoveolalris X. Li and Q. Li, 2010 i g
 Oxybelus flagellifoveolaris X. Li and Q. Li, 2010 c g
 Oxybelus flavicornis Arnold, 1927 i c g
 Oxybelus flavigaster Kazenas, 2002 i c g
 Oxybelus flavipes Cameron, 1890 i c g
 Oxybelus flaviventris Arnold, 1927 i c g
 Oxybelus fossor Rohwer and Cockerell, 1908 i c g
 Oxybelus fraternus R. Bohart, 1993 i c g
 Oxybelus fraudulentus Arnold, 1940 i c g
 Oxybelus fritzi R. Bohart, 1993 i c g
 Oxybelus frontis R. Bohart, 1993 i c g
 Oxybelus fulvicaudis Cameron, 1908 i c g
 Oxybelus fulvopilosus Cameron, 1890 i c
 Oxybelus funereus Krombein, 1982 i c g
 Oxybelus furcifer R. Turner, 1917 i c g
 Oxybelus furculatus Manikandan, Dey and Farooqi, 1998 i c g
 Oxybelus fuscohirtus Gussakovskij, 1930 i c g
 Oxybelus fuscus Krombein, 2001 i c g
 Oxybelus genisei R. Bohart, 1993 i c g
 Oxybelus glasunowi F. Morawitz, 1894 i c g
 Oxybelus gobiensis Tsuneki, 1972 i c g
 Oxybelus gracilissimus Kazenas, 1990 i c g
 Oxybelus guichardi de Beaumont, 1950 i c g
 Oxybelus haemorrhoidalis Olivier, 1812 i c g
 Oxybelus harraricus Arnold, 1927 i c g
 Oxybelus hastatus Fabricius, 1804 i c g
 Oxybelus hessei Arnold, 1929 i c g
 Oxybelus huae R. Bohart, 1993 i c g
 Oxybelus hurdi R. Bohart and Schlinger, 1956 i c g
 Oxybelus imperialis Gerstaecker, 1867 i c g
 Oxybelus inornatus (C. Robertson, 1901) i c g
 Oxybelus insularis Kohl, 1884 i c g
 Oxybelus irwini R. Bohart, 1993 i c g
 Oxybelus iwatai Tsuneki, 1976 i c g
 Oxybelus jamaicae R. Bohart, 1993 i c g
 Oxybelus kirgisicus Radoszkowski, 1893 i c g
 Oxybelus kizilkumii Radoszkowski, 1877 i c g
 Oxybelus koreanus Tsuneki, 1974 i c g
 Oxybelus krombeini R. Bohart and Schlinger, 1956 i c g
 Oxybelus laetus Say, 1837 i c g
 Oxybelus lamellatus Olivier, 1811 i c g
 Oxybelus lanceolatus Gerstaecker, 1867 i c g
 Oxybelus latidens Gerstaecker, 1867 g
 Oxybelus latifrons Kohl, 1892 i c g
 Oxybelus latilineatus Cameron, 1908 i c g
 Oxybelus latro Olivier, 1812 i c g
 Oxybelus lepturus Arnold, 1927 i c g
 Oxybelus lewisi Cameron, 1890 i c g
 Oxybelus limatus Arnold, 1927 i c g
 Oxybelus lineatus (Fabricius, 1787) i c g
 Oxybelus linguifer R. Turner, 1917 i c g
 Oxybelus lingula Gerstaecker, 1867 i c g
 Oxybelus linsleyi R. Bohart and Schlinger, 1956 i c g
 Oxybelus lubricus de Beaumont, 1950 i c g
 Oxybelus macswaini R. Bohart and Schlinger, 1956 i c g
 Oxybelus maculipes F. Smith, 1856 i c g
 Oxybelus maidlii Kohl, 1924 i c g
 Oxybelus major Mickel, 1916 i c g
 Oxybelus malaysianus Tsuneki, 1974 i c g
 Oxybelus manaliensis Manikandan, Dey and Farooqi, 1999 i
 Oxybelus mandibularis Dahlbom, 1845 i c g
 Oxybelus maracandicus Radoszkowski, 1877 i c g
 Oxybelus marginatus F. Smith, 1856 i c g
 Oxybelus marginellus Spinola, 1851 i c g
 Oxybelus marginicollis Gussakovskij, 1933 i c g
 Oxybelus matabele Arnold, 1927 i c g
 Oxybelus melanitus R. Bohart, 1993 i c g
 Oxybelus mendozae R. Bohart, 1993 i c g
 Oxybelus menoni Manikandan, Dey and Farooqi, 1998 i c g
 Oxybelus merwensis Radoszkowski, 1893 i c g
 Oxybelus metopias Kohl, 1894 i c g
 Oxybelus mexicanus C. Robertson, 1889 i c g
 Oxybelus mimeticus R. Bohart, 1992 i c g
 Oxybelus minutissimus F. Morawitz, 1892 i c g
 Oxybelus moczari Tsuneki, 1972 i c g
 Oxybelus morrisoni R. Bohart, 1993 i c g
 Oxybelus mucronatus (Fabricius, 1793) i c g
 Oxybelus nanus Bingham, 1897 i c g
 Oxybelus napoensis R. Bohart, 1993 i c g
 Oxybelus nasutus Bischoff, 1913 i c g
 Oxybelus natalensis Arnold, 1927 i c g
 Oxybelus neuvillei Magretti, 1908 i c g
 Oxybelus niger C. Robertson, 1889 i c g
 Oxybelus nigrilamellatus X. Li and Q. Li, 2008 i c g
 Oxybelus nigritulus R. Turner, 1917 i c g
 Oxybelus nipponicus Tsuneki, 1966 i c g
 Oxybelus oasicola Tsuneki, 1972 i c g
 Oxybelus occitanicus Marquet, 1896 i c g
 Oxybelus osteni R. Bohart, 1993 i c g
 Oxybelus packardii C. Robertson, 1889 i c g
 Oxybelus paenemarginatus (Viereck, 1906) i c g
 Oxybelus pallens Kazenas, 1990 i c g
 Oxybelus pallidus Arnold, 1927 i c g
 Oxybelus palmetorum de Beaumont, 1950 i c g
 Oxybelus paraagilis Manikandan, Dey and Farooqi, 1999 i c g
 Oxybelus paracochise R. Bohart and Schlinger, 1956 i c g
 Oxybelus paraguayensis Brèthes, 1909 i c g
 Oxybelus paramenoni Manikandan, Dey and Farooqi, 1998 i c g
 Oxybelus paratransiens Manikandan, Dey and Farooqi, 1999 i c g
 Oxybelus paratridentatus Manikandan, Dey and Farooqi, 1999 i c g
 Oxybelus parvus Cresson, 1865 i c g
 Oxybelus paucipunctatus Arnold, 1927 i c g
 Oxybelus pectoralis F. Morawitz, 1893 i c g
 Oxybelus penai R. Bohart, 1992 i c g
 Oxybelus peringueyi de Saussure, 1892 i c g
 Oxybelus perornatus Arnold, 1945 i c g
 Oxybelus peruensis R. Bohart, 1993 i c g
 Oxybelus peruvicus R. Bohart, 1993 i c g
 Oxybelus philippinensis Pate, 1938 i c g
 Oxybelus phyllophorus Kohl, 1898 i c g
 Oxybelus pictisentis Cameron, 1908 i c g
 Oxybelus pictus Arnold, 1927 i c g
 Oxybelus pilosus Arnold, 1927 i c g
 Oxybelus pitanta Pate, 1943 i c g
 Oxybelus platensis Brèthes, 1901 i c g
 Oxybelus plaumanni R. Bohart, 1993 i c g
 Oxybelus polyacanthus A. Costa, 1882 i c g
 Oxybelus polyceros Pate, 1943 i c g
 Oxybelus propodealis R. Bohart, 1993 i c g
 Oxybelus pulawskii Tsuneki, 1972 i c g
 Oxybelus pygidialis Gussakovskij, 1952 i c g
 Oxybelus pyrura (Rohwer, 1914) c g
 Oxybelus pyrurus (Rohwer, 1914) i
 Oxybelus quatuordecimnotatus Jurine, 1807 i c g
 Oxybelus rancocas Pate, 1943 i c g
 Oxybelus rejectus C. Baker, 1896 i c g
 Oxybelus rhodopyga R. Bohart, 1993 i c g
 Oxybelus robertsonii C. Baker, 1896 i c g
 Oxybelus robustus Cameron, 1890 i c g
 Oxybelus romingeri R. Bohart, 1993 i c g
 Oxybelus roraimae R. Bohart, 1993 i c g
 Oxybelus rubrocaudatus Arnold, 1927 i c g
 Oxybelus ruficaudis Cameron, 1905 i c g
 Oxybelus ruficornis F. Smith, 1856 i c
 Oxybelus rufopictus F. Morawitz, 1892 i c g
 Oxybelus sarafschani Radoszkowski, 1877 i c g
 Oxybelus schlingeri R. Bohart, 1993 i c g
 Oxybelus schusteri R. Bohart, 1993 i c g
 Oxybelus scutellatus R. Bohart, 1993 i c g
 Oxybelus sericeus C. Robertson, 1889 i c g
 Oxybelus similis Cresson, 1865 i c g
 Oxybelus slanskyae R. Bohart, 1993 i c g
 Oxybelus solitarius Arnold, 1927 i c g
 Oxybelus sparideus Cockerell, 1895 i c g
 Oxybelus spectabilis Gerstaecker, 1867 i c g
 Oxybelus spinulosus Gussakovskij, 1935 i c g
 Oxybelus stangei R. Bohart, 1993 i c g
 Oxybelus stevensoni Arnold, 1927 i c g
 Oxybelus strandi Yasumatsu, 1935 i c g
 Oxybelus subcornutus Cockerell, 1895 i c g
 Oxybelus subcristatus de Saussure, 1892 i c g
 Oxybelus subspinosus Klug in Waltl, 1835 i c g
 Oxybelus subtilis Gussakovskij, 1935 i c g
 Oxybelus subulatus C. Robertson, 1889 i c g
 Oxybelus suluensis Pate, 1938 i c g
 Oxybelus taenigaster (Viereck, 1906) i c g
 Oxybelus taprobanensis Pate, 1930 i c g
 Oxybelus tarapacae R. Bohart, 1992 i c g
 Oxybelus tartagalae R. Bohart, 1993 i c g
 Oxybelus taschenbergi Kohl, 1884 i c g
 Oxybelus tengu Tsuneki, 1972 i c g
 Oxybelus thailanditus Tsuneki, 1974 i c g
 Oxybelus timberlakei R. Bohart and Schlinger, 1956 i c g
 Oxybelus tinklyi Guichard, 1990 i c g
 Oxybelus toroi R. Bohart, 1992 i c g
 Oxybelus transcaspicus Radoszkowski, 1888 i c g
 Oxybelus transiens R. Turner, 1917 i c g
 Oxybelus tricolor Gussakovskij, 1952 i c g
 Oxybelus tridentatus F. Smith, 1856 i c g
 Oxybelus trispinosus (Fabricius, 1787) i c g
 Oxybelus tshardarensis Kazenas, 1994 i c g
 Oxybelus uniglumis (Linnaeus, 1758) i c g b
 Oxybelus uralensis Tsuneki, 1976 i c g
 Oxybelus uturoae Cheesman, 1928 i c g
 Oxybelus vardyi R. Bohart, 1993 i c g
 Oxybelus varians F. Morawitz, 1891 i c g
 Oxybelus variegatus Wesmael, 1852 i c g
 Oxybelus ventralis W. Fox, 1894 i c g
 Oxybelus verhoeffi de Beaumont, 1950 i c g
 Oxybelus wasbaueri R. Bohart, 1993 i c g
 Oxybelus willinki R. Bohart, 1993 i c g
 Oxybelus willowmorensis Arnold, 1927 i c g
 Oxybelus woosnami Arnold, 1927 i c g
 Oxybelus xanthogaster Pate, 1938 i c g
 Oxybelus xerophilus R. Bohart and Schlinger, 1956 i c g
 Oxybelus zavattarii Guiglia, 1943 i c g
 Oxybelus zohnsteini Kazenas, 2004 i c g

Data sources: i = ITIS, c = Catalogue of Life, g = GBIF, b = Bugguide.net

References

Oxybelus